The 1991 Suzuka 1000 km was the fourth round of the 1991 All Japan Sports Prototype Car Endurance Championship season and the 20th running of the 1000 km Suzuka. It took place at Suzuka Circuit, Japan on August 25, 1991.

Race results
Results are as follows:

Statistics
Pole Position – #37 TOM'S 92C-V – 1:47.376
Fastest Lap – #36 TOM'S 91C-V – 1:53.755
Winner's Race Time – 5:44:52.513

References

Suzuka 1000km